Notharctidae is an extinct family of adapiform primates found primarily in North America and Europe.

Classification 
Family Notharctidae
Subfamily Asiadapinae
Subfamily Cercamoniinae
Subfamily Notharctinae

References

Literature cited

External links
Mikko's Phylogeny Archive

Prehistoric strepsirrhines
Eocene first appearances
Eocene extinctions
Taxa named by Édouard Louis Trouessart
Prehistoric mammal families
Primate families